"Celebration Generation" is a song by German DJ WestBam. It was released in December 1993 as the lead single from the album, Bam Bam Bam.

Track listing
 "Celebration Generation" (Westbam Remix) - 5:26	
 "Celebration Generation" (Ravers Nature Remix) - 5:46	
 "Celebration Generation" (RMB Remix) - 6:22

Chart performance

References

1994 singles
1994 songs